Anthony Ellis may refer to:

 Anthony Ellys (1690–1761), English bishop of St David's
 Anthony Ellis (writer), Welsh-Australian writer and television executive
 Tony Ellis (born 1964), English footballer